Santokben Sarmanbhai Jadeja was an Indian gangster and politician from Gujarat. She was known popularly known as Godmother. Her area of operations have been in and around Porbandar. Though now marginalized, she was once a key player in the criminal operations of Porbandar. Santokben was charged with 14 murders and had 500 cases against her gang members. She served as an Member of the Legislative Assembly  from Kutiyana from 1990 to 1995.

Early life 
She was married to Sarman Munja Jadeja, a leader of Maher community, who was an ordinary mill worker at Maharana Mill, but became a gangster and don when he killed the local gangster Devu Vagher, who was hired by the mill owner to break the strike.

Till 1986 Santokben was playing the role of a home maker and a mother. When under the influence of Pandurang Shastri of the Swadhyay movement her husband Sarman had bid farewell to arms and crime. But in December 1986, her husband was shot dead by Kala Keshav gang owing to old rivalry. This brought Santokben in to forefront, who decided to go back to old way of his spouse, to get even. She hailed from Kutiyana town in Porbandar district. She was an MLA from 1990 to 1995 as a candidate of Janata Dal and was close to Chimanbhai Patel.

Criminal activities 
She was alleged to be behind the murder of 14 people, who she believed were responsible for her husband's murder. She was arrested for giving shelter to the people, who raped two girls.

In 2007, she came into the news again with the killing of Navghan Arsi, the son of Arsi Jadeja, the brother-in-law of Santokben. She was in the news in 2008 when her daughter-in-law was shot dead by her son Karan Jadeja.

Police records reveal that in the late 80s and early 90s, her gang had about 525 criminal cases lodged against it at its peak. It was reported that her gang comprised 100 men, mainly from the Mer community. She was booked in numerous murder cases. She was named in 2005 in the murder of Keshu Odedara, a councilor with Porbandar municipality.

Her period of operation started during the 1980s and lasted for about a decade, until she was made to relocate to Rajkot.

Politics 
She was elected on the Janata Dal ticket from the Kutiyana constituency in the Porbandar district. She served as an MLA from 1990 to 1995.

In December 2002, she filed her nomination to contest the election from the Kutiyana assembly seat but later withdrew in favor of the Indian National Congress candidate.

Death 
She died of a heart attack in Porbandar, Gujarat on 31 March 2011.

In popular culture 
She was the subject of a Hindi film, Godmother (1999), where her role was played by Shabana Azmi, who later won the National Film Award for Best Actress. She was not happy with how she was portrayed in the film.

References 

1949 births
People from Porbandar
Gujarati people
Gujarat MLAs 1990–1995
Indian politicians convicted of crimes
2011 deaths
Women in Gujarat politics
Crime in Gujarat
Indian gangsters
Female organized crime figures
Indian crime bosses
Indian female criminals
Janata Dal politicians